Ami Omer Dadaon (born 26 December 2000) is an Israeli Paralympic swimmer. He represented Israel at the 2020 Summer Paralympics.

Career
Dadaon represented Israel at the 2020 Summer Paralympics and won gold medals in the 50 metre freestyle S4 and 200 metre freestyle S4 events, and a silver medal in the 150 metre individual medley SM4 event.

References

External links
 
 

2000 births
Living people
Israeli male swimmers
Paralympic swimmers of Israel
Medalists at the World Para Swimming Championships
Medalists at the World Para Swimming European Championships
Paralympic medalists in swimming
Paralympic gold medalists for Israel
Paralympic silver medalists for Israel
Swimmers at the 2020 Summer Paralympics
Medalists at the 2020 Summer Paralympics
Israeli Sephardi Jews
Jewish sportspeople
Israeli Mizrahi Jews
S4-classified Paralympic swimmers